Pyrrole-2-carboxylic acid is an organic compound with the formula HNC4H3CO2H.  It is one of two monocarboxylic acids of pyrrole.  It is a white solid.  It arises in nature by dehydrogenation of the amino acid proline. It also arises by carboxylation of pyrrole.  The ethyl ester of this acid is readily prepared from pyrrole.

References

 
Carboxylic acids